Bare Bones is a 2010 acoustic live album by Canadian rock singer Bryan Adams.

Track listing

Personnel 
 Bryan Adams - acoustic guitar, harmonica, vocals
 Gary Breit - piano

Additional personnel 
 Ben Dobie - recording
 Bob Clearmountain - mixing
 Jody Perpick - sound

Certifications

References 

Bryan Adams albums
2010 live albums
A&M Records albums